The Ouled Djerir are a small Arab tribe of the Bechar area in southwestern Algeria.  Their close alliance with the neighbouring Doui-Menia has led them to be counted as the  "sixth fifth" of that tribe.  Their economy was traditionally based on camel-herding along with a little agriculture.

References

Arab tribes in Algeria